Ireby is a village in the Allerdale borough of Cumbria, England. with a population of around 180. Historically, it was in the county of Cumberland, since 1974 it has been in Cumbria.

It was granted a market charter in 1237.

Location
It is located above the River Ellen, just outside the Lake District National Park, in the area locally called Back o'Skiddaw, with views to the Caldbeck Fells.

Nearby villages include Uldale, Torpenhow and Boltongate.

Amenities
Ireby has two village halls, the main Globe Hall and the smaller Women's Institutes Hall.

Ireby has a music festival attracting a wide range of popular musicians and capacity audiences. In 2010 the Festival had Kate Rusby playing.

The village pub was reopened in 2016 after a long period of closure, it was a haunt of John Peel.

Governance
Ireby is in the parliamentary constituency of Workington. In the December 2019 general election, the Tory candidate for Workington, Mark Jenkinson, was elected the MP, overturning a 9.4 per cent Labour majority from the 2017 election to eject shadow environment secretary Sue Hayman by a margin of 4,136 votes. Until the December 2019 general election The Labour Party had won the seat in the constituency in every general election since 1979.The Conservative Party had only been elected once in Workington since World War II, at the 1976 by-election.

Before Brexit, its residents were covered by the North West England European Parliamentary Constituency.

For Local Government purposes it is in the Boltons  Ward of Allerdale Borough Council and the Bothel and Wharrels Ward of Cumbria County Council.

The village forms part of the civil parish of Ireby and Uldale and has its own Parish Council along with Uldale,  Ireby and Uldale Parish Council.

In popular culture
A documentary series, Cumbrian Tales, was commissioned by the BBC in 1998, but taken off air after one episode due to "conflict of interest". The six-part series was eventually screened on ITV in 1999.

See also

Listed buildings in Ireby and Uldale

References

External links
 Cumbria County History Trust: Ireby, Low (nb: provisional research only – see Talk page)
 Cumbria County History Trust: Ireby, High (nb: provisional research only – see Talk page)

Villages in Cumbria
Allerdale